The intercostal lymph nodes (intercostal glands) occupy the posterior parts of the intercostal spaces, in relation to the intercostal vessels.

They receive the deep lymphatics from the postero-lateral aspect of the chest; some of these vessels are interrupted by small lateral intercostal glands.
 The efferents of the glands in the lower four or five spaces unite to form a trunk, which descends and opens either into the cisterna chyli or into the commencement of the thoracic duct.
 The efferents of the glands in the upper spaces of the left side end in the thoracic duct; those of the corresponding right spaces, in the right lymphatic duct.

References

Lymphatics of the torso